San Salvador d'Alesga is one of thirteen parishes (administrative divisions) in Teverga, a municipality within the province and autonomous community of Asturias, in northern Spain. The Castillo de Alesga is located in San Salvador d'Alesga.

The postal code is 33111.

Villages and hamlets
Fresnedo (Fresnéu)
San Salvador

References

Parishes in Teverga